Neil McCafferty (born 19 July 1984) is an Irish footballer who last played for NIFL Premiership side Warrenpoint Town.

Career
McCafferty began his career at Charlton Athletic in 2000–01. He can play either central midfield or on the right-hand side. In 2001, McCafferty was called into Charlton's first-team squad to face Manchester United at Old Trafford at just 16 years of age. He was a regular in both Charlton's under-19 and reserve teams and was captain of the reserve side in 2004–2005. Whilst under contract with Charlton, McCafferty also had loan spells at both Cambridge United and Rushden & Diamonds.

At international level, the player was a regular at youth levels from Under-16 to Under-19 with the Republic of Ireland. His appearances for Ireland included the 2003 Oporto Youth Tournament held in Portugal where he represented the Under-19s.

During his spell with Rushden & Diamonds, McCafferty helped the club avoid relegation from the Football League. Having originally signed a one-month deal at Nene Park toward the end of January 2005, his stay was soon extended to three months after a number of impressive performances which aided in steadying the sinking ship.

McCafferty was so popular with Rushden & Diamonds fans that when he was released by Charlton Athletic at the end of the 2004–05 season after failing to break into Alan Curbishley's first-team plans, he was signed by the club that had previously loaned him.

McCafferty signed for his home-town club in July 2006 and made his debut away to Bray Wanderers on
4 August 2006. However, he only managed this one appearance as a substitute before injury ruled him out of the 2006 season. Prior to this and upon his arrival at the club, the Derry City manager at the time, Stephen Kenny was quoted as saying:

McCafferty only managed to make eight league appearances for the Candystripes, five coming from the bench.

Late in 2007, McCafferty spent time with Gillingham on trial. He eventually signed for Grays Athletic on 1 January 2008.

On 1 July 2008, Finn Harps announced that McCafferty had signed for the League of Ireland Premier Division side.

On 10 December 2008, Dungannon Swifts manager John Cunningham confirmed that McCafferty would be joining the Swifts squad, but was unavailable to play until the transfer window opened in January.

On 12 June 2010, McCafferty signed for Portadown.

On 28 January 2011, McCafferty signed for Ballymena United on loan until the end of the current season.

References

External links

 McCafferty's player profile on CityWeb

1984 births
Living people
Charlton Athletic F.C. players
Cambridge United F.C. players
Rushden & Diamonds F.C. players
Derry City F.C. players
Grays Athletic F.C. players
Finn Harps F.C. players
Dungannon Swifts F.C. players
English Football League players
National League (English football) players
League of Ireland players
NIFL Premiership players
Association footballers from Northern Ireland
Republic of Ireland international footballers from Northern Ireland
Sportspeople from Derry (city)
Ballymena United F.C. players
Portadown F.C. players
Association football midfielders
Warrenpoint Town F.C. players
Coleraine F.C. players